Thumb Peak may refer to:

 Thumb Peak (Arizona) in Arizona, USA
 Thumb Peak (British Columbia) in British Columbia, Canada
 Thumb Peak (Palawan) in Palawan, Philippines